Matthew Steven Mangini (born December 21, 1985) is an American former Major League Baseball infielder who played for the Seattle Mariners in 2010.

College career
Mangini played college baseball for both the NC State Wolfpack and Oklahoma State Cowboys. In 2006, he played collegiate summer baseball with the Hyannis Mets of the Cape Cod Baseball League, winning the league's Thurman Munson Award for highest batting average (.310), and being named starting third baseman at the league's all-star game.

Professional career
Mangini was drafted in the supplemental 1st round of the 2007 Major League Baseball Draft. On September 22, 2010, Mangini was added to the Seattle Mariners 40-man roster.

Mangini started the  season on the disabled list and was activated on April 21, but was immediately optioned to Triple-A. He was released on August 23, after leaving Triple-A Tacoma for an undisclosed personal issue.

The Tampa Bay Rays signed Mangini to a minor league contract on December 6, 2011. He also received an invitation to spring training. The Arizona Diamondbacks signed Mangini to a minor league contract on August 14, 2012. He signed a minor league contract with the Cincinnati Reds on February 2, 2013. He was released on March 27.

References

External links

1985 births
Living people
Baseball players from Springfield, Massachusetts
Major League Baseball third basemen
Seattle Mariners players
North Carolina Tar Heels baseball players
Oklahoma State Cowboys baseball players
Hyannis Harbor Hawks players
Arizona League Mariners players
Everett AquaSox players
High Desert Mavericks players
West Tennessee Diamond Jaxx players
Tacoma Rainiers players
Durham Bulls players
Mobile BayBears players